Beverly Hills Schools (BHS) is a group of private schools in Sheikh Zayed City, 6th of October City, Giza Governorate, Egypt, near Cairo. It includes an American School, a British School, and a German school.

The German school, Deutsche Schule Beverly Hills Kairo is recognised as a German school abroad by the Central Agency for German Schools Abroad (ZfA). It serves Kindergarten though Oberstufe Grade 12.

American School Beverly Hills Cairo serves up to high school. It was chartered in 2007.

English School Beverly Hills Cairo or Beverly Hills English Language School includes up to secondary level 3.

References

External links
Beverly Hills Schools

International schools in Greater Cairo
Schools in 6th of October (city)